Nkem Nwankwo  (12 June 1936 – 12 June 2001) was a Nigerian novelist and poet.

Biography
Born in Nawfia-Awka, a village near the Igbo city of Onitsha in Nigeria, Nwankwo attended University College in Ibadan, gaining a BA in 1962. After graduating he took a teaching job at Ibadan Grammar School, before going on to write for magazines, including Drum and working for the Nigerian Broadcasting Corporation.

He wrote several stories for children that were published in 1963 such as Tales Out of School. He then wrote More Tales out of School in 1965.

Writer of short stories and poems, Nwankwo gained significant attention with his first novel Danda (1964), which was made into a widely performed musical that was entered in the 1966 World Festival of Negro Arts in Dakar, Senegal. During the Nigerian Civil War Nwankwo worked on Biafra's Arts Council. In 1968, in collaboration with Samuel X. Ifekjika, he wrote Biafra: The Making of a Nation. After the civil war, he returned to Lagos and worked on the national newspaper, the Daily Times. His subsequent works included the satire My Mercedes Is Bigger than Yours.

During the 1970s, Nwankwo earned a Master's and Ph.D. at Indiana University. He also wrote about corruption in Nigeria. He spent the latter part of his life in the United States and taught at Michigan State University and Tennessee State University.

He died in his sleep in Tennessee, from complications from a heart imbalance that he had been battling for some years.

Books
 The Scapegoat — 1984 (Enugu: Fourth Dimension Publishers)
 My Mercedes Is Bigger than Yours — 1975
 Danda - 1963 (Lagos: African Universities Press; London: Deutsch, 1964)
 Tales Out of School (short stories; 1963)

Short stories 
 The Gambler, in: Black Orpheus no. 9 
 His Mother, in: Nigeria Magazine no. 80, March 1964
 The Man Who Lost in: Nigeria Magazine no. 84, March 1965

Other
 Sex Has Been Good To Me (reprint of essays), 2004
 Shadow of the Masquerade (autobiography), Nashville, TN: Niger House Publications 1994, pp. 58–61
 A Song for Fela & Other Poems. Nashville, TN: Nigerhouse, 1993
 Theatre reviews in: Nigeria Magazine no. 72, March 1962

References

 Akwanya, A. N. The Self in the Mirror: Nkem Nwankwo and the Study of Exhibitionism in:  OKIKE 39 (1988) 39–52.

External links
 "Nkem Nwankwo". Anderson Brown's Literary Blog, 11 January 2010.
 G. D. Killam and Alicia L. Kerfoot, Student Encyclopedia of African Literature, ABC-CLIO, 2008, p 221

1936 births
2001 deaths
Indiana University alumni
Michigan State University faculty
Tennessee State University faculty
Nigerian male novelists
Igbo novelists
People from Anambra State
Nigerian emigrants to the United States
20th-century Nigerian novelists
People of the Nigerian Civil War
University of Ibadan alumni
20th-century male writers